Charles Maury Wallace Sterling (born September 1, 1971) is an American actor. He is best known for playing Max Piotrowski in Homeland, Rafferty in the comedy film Beverly Hills Chihuahua and Lester Tremor in the action film Smokin' Aces.

Life and career
Sterling was born in Mill Valley, California. He has guest starred on numerous television series, including Judging Amy, ER, Star Trek: Enterprise, 24 and CSI: Crime Scene Investigation to name a few. His only TV series regular was in the sitcom Alright Already, which lasted only one season from 1997-98. It originally aired on the now-defunct WB Television Network.

Sterling has appeared in a number of films, mostly in supporting roles. His prominent role came in the 2006 action film Smokin' Aces where he played Lester Tremor of the psychotic neo-Nazi Tremor Brothers (opposite Chris Pine and Kevin Durand). His role required shaving his head, and shaving his eyebrows off. His other prominent role was in Beverly Hills Chihuahua (2008) as Rafferty, one of the villains who dognap Chloe (the chihuahua voiced by Drew Barrymore).

Filmography

Film

Television

Video games

References

External links

1971 births
Living people
20th-century American male actors
21st-century American male actors
American male film actors
American male television actors
American male video game actors
American male voice actors
Male actors from California
People from Mill Valley, California